Callum Scott Howells (born 29 April 1999) is a Welsh actor, singer, and television personality who began his career as a child. He is known for his role as Colin Morris-Jones in the Channel 4's 2021 drama It's a Sin.

Early life and education
Howells was born in Pontypridd to parents Alison and Keith and grew up nearby in Tonyrefail and Porth. His grandfather, Bryn Howells, was a life member of the Treorchy Male Choir.

Callum attended Treorchy Comprehensive School where he was head boy. He took classes with Rhondda Stage School, Superstars in the Making in Barry, and was a member of the National Youth Music Theatre. He was scouted by an agent when he was 16 and went on to train at the Royal Welsh College of Music & Drama, graduating in 2020.

Career
Howells made his debut in a regional production of Oliver! He was a founding member of the boys' choir Only Boys Aloud, performing with them on series 6 of Britain's Got Talent in 2012 and later for Prince Harry and Meghan in 2018. He has since become a youth ambassador.

He appeared in series 2 of the CBBC reality documentary series Show Me What You're Made Of. He was 13 at the time. He later returned as a guest presenter. He worked as a Royal Correspondent on the CBBC series Blue Peter.

Howells won the 2013 Star of the Stage talent show. In 2014, he played Godfrey in Matthew Bourne's New Adventures production of Lord of the Flies at the Wales Millennium Centre. He performed with Treorchy Male Choir in 2015, Pendyrus Male Choir in 2017, and Dunvant Male Choir in 2018.

When he was 17, Howells auditioned for the singing competition Let It Shine with the song "You'll Be Back" from Hamilton. He was part of Group 4 and made it to the final 25. However, he pulled out to make time to play Arpad Laszlo in the West End production of She Loves Me at Menier Chocolate Factory.

In May 2016 he played the lead role in Blackout, a production in the nationwide Connections programme of the National Theatre. The first public review of his acting was headed “Actor to Watch” and read “Callum Scott Howells delivers a performance of ferocious impact.”

In March 2019 he appeared at the Other Room Theatre in Cardiff in Crave by Sarah Kane produced by the Royal Welsh College of Music and Drama.

In October 2019, it was announced Howells would star in Russell T Davies' miniseries It's a Sin as Colin Morris-Jones. The character is loosely based on a real-life past boyfriend of Davies. The series premiered in January 2021 on Channel 4 and February on HBO Max.

From 3 October 2022, Howells played The Emcee in the West End production of Cabaret at the Kit Kat Club at the Playhouse Theatre. On New Year's Eve 2022 he appeared in a vignette from the show on BBC 1's The Graham Norton Show.

Howells had been cast to play in Gary Owen's play Romeo and Julie for the Royal National Theatre in 2020, Due to the COVID-19 pandemic, the co-production with the Sherman Theatre was postponed and opened at the Dorfman Theatre in February 2023. The Times described Howell in the Romeo role as: "an entertaining, unsentimental, smartly judged performance."

Personal life
Howells identifies as queer. He has voiced his support for Welsh independence.

Filmography

Stage

Awards and nominations

Notes

References

External links

Living people
1999 births
21st-century Welsh male actors
Alumni of the Royal Welsh College of Music & Drama
Choristers
People educated at Treorchy Comprehensive School
People from Porth
People from Pontypridd
People from Tonyrefail
Welsh LGBT actors
Welsh LGBT singers
Queer actors
Queer men
Welsh child singers
Welsh male child actors
Welsh male musical theatre actors
Welsh male stage actors
Welsh television personalities
21st-century Welsh LGBT people